Billy Palmer was a Major League Baseball pitcher. He started four games for the Maroons in late May and early June, losing all four.

Sources

Major League Baseball pitchers
St. Louis Maroons players
Baseball players from St. Louis
Memphis Reds players
Year of death missing
Year of birth missing
19th-century baseball players